Santiago Ventura may refer to:

Santiago Ventura Bertomeu (born 1980), professional tennis player from Spain
Santiago Ventura Morales, Mexican national who had US murder conviction overturned